Jimmy MacLaren (26 November 1921 – 20 July 2004) was a Scottish footballer, who played as a goalkeeper in the Football League for Chester and Carlisle United.

References

1921 births
2004 deaths
People from Crieff
Scottish footballers
Association football goalkeepers
Berwick Rangers F.C. players
Chester City F.C. players
Carlisle United F.C. players
English Football League players
Scottish Football League players